The 1918 Detroit Junior College football team represented Detroit Junior College (later renamed Wayne State University) as an independent during the 1918 college football season. The team was coached by David L. Holmes and compiled a 4–0 record and outscored opponents by a total of 99 to 0. The team was made up of members of the school's Student Army Training Corps.

Two of the victories, including the first in program history, were against Assumption College. The first game was played in Canada at Sandwich. Fullback Wayne Brenkert scored three touchdowns in the first game against Assumption. The team also defeated the University of Detroit (on Thanksgiving Day) and Michigan State Normal in the first meetings with each of those two schools. A game with Western State was initially scheduled but cancelled.

The team played its three home games at Goldberg Field, which was located at Ferry Avenue and Hastings Street in Detroit. Wayne considers the 1918 team to be its first intercollegiate football team, though contemporary press accounts also reference a 1917 football team. 

Detroit Junior College, the first junior college in the state of Michigan, was established by David D Mackenzie who was the principal of Detroit Central High School. The junior college was located on the campus of the high school, Old Main.  Wayne Brenkert played for both Detroit Central High School (winning a High School National Championship in 1915) and Detroit Junior College and is a member of Wayne State University Hall of Fame.

Schedule

References

Detroit Junior College
Wayne State Warriors football seasons
College football undefeated seasons
Detroit Junior College football